This is a list of ship commissionings in 1925.



Sources 
http://www.netherlandsnavy.nl/Javacl.html
https://web.archive.org/web/20131005094320/http://www.dutchsubmarines.com/classes/class_kxi.htm

1925